Ma Xiaowei (born December 1959) is a Chinese physician and politician who has served as head of the National Health Commission of China since March 2018. Ma is also president of the Chinese Medical Association and vice president of the Red Cross Society of China.


Biography 
Ma was born in Wutai County, Shanxi in December 1959. He is part of the Han ethnic group.

In April 1978, he was accepted to China Medical University. Upon graduation in December 1982, he was assigned to work at the Ministry of Health. He joined the Chinese Communist Party (CCP) in 1982. He became a cadre at the then Ministry of Health before working for China Medical University where he later served as hospital administrator and party secretary. He also became the director of Liaoning Provincial Health Department.

In October 2001 he was appointed Vice Minister of Health. When the ministry was reorganized into the National Health and Family Planning Commission, he continued to serve as deputy director. In May 2015 he concurrently served as vice-president of the Red Cross Society of China. On December 15, 2015, he was appointed president of Chinese Medical Association, replacing Chen Zhu. On 19 March 2018, Ma was appointed director of National Health Commission at the first session of the 13th National People's Congress. Ma has been leading efforts to fight the COVID-19 pandemic as well as communication around it.

References

External links 
 Biography of Ma Xiaowei

1959 births
Living people
China Medical University (PRC) alumni
People's Republic of China politicians from Shanxi
Chinese Communist Party politicians from Shanxi
Politicians from Xinzhou
Physicians from Shanxi
COVID-19 pandemic in China